Ohio's 9th congressional district has been represented by Representative Marcy Kaptur (D) since 1983. It was one of five districts that voted for Donald Trump in the 2020 presidential election while being won or held by a Democrat in 2022.

This district is in the northern part of the state, bordering Michigan, Indiana, and Ontario, Canada (via Lake Erie), and includes all of Defiance, Williams, Fulton, Lucas, Ottawa, Sandusky, and Erie counties, and a portion of northern Wood County. 

The previous iteration of the 9th district has been called "The Snake by the Lake" due to its long and skinny appearance on the map and one of the "Top 5 Ugliest Districts" due to gerrymandering. The two parts of the district were connected only via the Thomas Edison Memorial Bridge between Erie and Ottawa counties, as well as Crane Creek State Park. Some Ohio Democrats argued that when the beach floods, the reconfigured 9th was not contiguous.

It was one of several districts challenged in a 2018 lawsuit seeking to overturn Ohio's congressional map as unconstitutional gerrymandering. According to the lawsuit, the 9th "eats its way across the southern border of Lake Erie" while fragmenting Cleveland and Toledo. In 2019, the Supreme Court refused to hear the case meaning that Ohio's congressional districts, including District 9, would not need to be redrawn.

List of largest municipalities
All or part of ten cities (whose population is greater than 5,000) are in the district.

The largest municipalities represented in this district include:

Toledo, population 313,619
Sandusky, population 27,844
Oregon, population 19,355
Sylvania, population 18,971
Maumee, population 14,286

Election results from presidential races 

 Results Under Current Lines (Since 2023)

List of members representing the district

Election results
The following chart shows historic election results. Bold type indicates victor. Italic type indicates incumbent.

Gerrymandering
The previous district lines from 2013-2023 were drawn by Republicans in 2011, following the redistricting based on the 2010 census. The boundaries of the 9th district have been cited as a signature example of the partisan gerrymandering of the Ohio redistricting. In 2011, Roll Call criticized it as a product of gerrymandering, naming it one of the United States' "Top 5 Ugliest Districts".

Historical district boundaries

See also
Ohio's congressional districts
List of United States congressional districts

References

 Congressional Biographical Directory of the United States 1774–present

09
Constituencies established in 1823
1823 establishments in Ohio